Kazlje is a village in the Municipality of Sežana in the Littoral region of Slovenia.

Church

The local church, built just outside the settlement, is dedicated to Saint Lawrence and belongs to the Parish of Tomaj.

References

External links

Kazlje on Geopedia

Populated places in the Municipality of Sežana